Bernardo Margarit, O.S.B. (died 1486) was a Roman Catholic prelate who served as Bishop of Catania (1479–1486) and Bishop of Cefalù (1475–1479).

Biography
Bernardo Margarit was ordained a priest in the Order of Saint Benedict.
On 18 Aug 1475, he was appointed during the papacy of Pope Sixtus IV as Bishop of Cefalù.
On 8 Feb 1479, he was appointed during the papacy of Pope Sixtus IV as Bishop of Catania.
On 3 Nov 1479, he was consecrated bishop by Dalmazio Gabrielli, Bishop of Siracusa. 
He served as Bishop of Catania until his death in 1486.

References

External links and additional sources
 (for Chronology of Bishops) 
 (for Chronology of Bishops) 
 (for Chronology of Bishops) 
 (for Chronology of Bishops) 

15th-century Roman Catholic bishops in Sicily
Bishops appointed by Pope Sixtus IV
1486 deaths
Benedictine bishops